Acanthoparyphium is a genus of flatworms belonging to the family Himasthlidae.

The species of this genus are found in Australia and Japan.

Species:

Acanthoparyphium charadrii 
Acanthoparyphium haematopi 
Acanthoparyphium jeetai 
Acanthoparyphium kurogamo 
Acanthoparyphium marilae 
Acanthoparyphium melanittae 
Acanthoparyphium ochthodromi 
Acanthoparyphium pagollae 
Acanthoparyphium phoenicopteri 
Acanthoparyphium spinulosum 
Acanthoparyphium squatarolae 
Acanthoparyphium tyosenense

References

Platyhelminthes